Sumed Ibrahim (born December 30, 1980, in Tamale, Ghana) is a Ghanaian soccer player.

Career
Ibrahim played five years of college soccer at the University of Maryland, playing in a total of 86 games while registering 25 goals and 28 assists. He was twice named an NSCAA first team All-American, and was a leading candidate for the Hermann Award his senior season.

After graduating from Maryland, Ibrahim was drafted 20th overall in the 2004 MLS SuperDraft by the Chicago Fire. He did not make much of an impact with the team his rookie season, playing only 82 minutes and garnering just a single start. The Fire released him after the season, and he signed with Harrisburg.

Ibrahim played two seasons with the City Islanders and also featured for the indoor Baltimore Blast during the 2005–06 winter season.

References

External links
 Maryland Profile

1980 births
Living people
Ghanaian footballers
Chicago Fire FC players
Indoor soccer players
Major League Soccer players
USL Second Division players
Maryland Terrapins men's soccer players
Penn FC players
Chicago Fire FC draft picks
All-American men's college soccer players
People from Tamale, Ghana
Association football midfielders
Baltimore Blast players
Major Indoor Soccer League (2001–2008) players
Ghanaian expatriate sportspeople in the United States
Expatriate soccer players in the United States
Ghanaian expatriate footballers